Aethria felderi is a moth of the subfamily Arctiinae. It was described by Rothschild in 1911. It is found in Suriname and Brazil.

References

Moths described in 1911
Arctiinae
Moths of South America